Theatre Under The Stars, commonly referred to as TUTS, is a not-for-profit charitable organization and one of the largest musical theatre companies in Vancouver. It is officially operated by the Theatre Under The Stars Musical Society, and presents two full length musicals during the summer season at Malkin Bowl in Stanley Park. In addition, the company participates in other park activities in association with the Vancouver Parks Board such as their annual Sing-A-Long. The society also operates the Malkin Bowl venue and routinely rents it to Live Nation Entertainment for the summer concert series.

History

In 1934 the Vancouver Park Board used funds from former Mayor W.H. Malkin to build an outdoor band shell for summer concerts and orchestra music in his wife's memory. This became known as the Malkin Bowl.

Vancouver Civic Theatre Society was founded in 1940 under the auspices of the Vancouver Park Board by the board superintendent A.S. Wootten, the conductor Basil Horsfall, and the actor E.V. Young, with advice from Gordon Hilker, to provide entertainment in Stanley Park. Theatre Under the Stars officially opened on 6 August 1940.

Theatre Under The Stars Society had its last season in 1963. Then in 1969 a new theatre company, Theatre in the Park, began presenting two musicals a season. The company renamed itself to Theatre Under the Stars in 1980.

In 1982 a fire destroyed part of Malkin Bowl but the company was able to survive and rebuild the damaged outdoor theatre. The company has filed for bankruptcy twice, once in 1963 and again 2005. Ironically both times during its production of Can-Can. Each time the company took a season and reorganized.

TUTS has worked with independent and large scale promoters such as Live Nation Entertainment to use the Malkin Bowl site for events and music concerts.

List of plays (alphabetical)

Notable alumni

See also
 
 Malkin Bowl

References

External links
 TUTS Website Official Website
 Theatre Under the Stars at Vancouver Info Center
 Theatre History University of British Columbia
 Stanley Park General Info Vancouver City
 
 

Musical theatre companies
Theatre companies in British Columbia
Stanley Park
Theatre in Vancouver